Novska railway station is a railway station on the Novska–Tovarnik railway in Novska, Croatia. There are three lines connecting Novska to Jasenovac, Okučani, and Lipovljani. The railway station consists of 18 railway tracks.

See also 
 Croatian Railways
 Zagreb–Belgrade railway

References 

Railway stations in Croatia